Jesus and his brothers may refer to:

 the brothers of Jesus
 The Adventures of Jesus and his Brothers, a show on Icebox.com